A Nicodemite is a person suspected of publicly misrepresenting their religious faith to conceal their true beliefs. The term is sometimes defined as referring to a Protestant Christian who lived in a Roman Catholic country and escaped persecution by concealing their Protestantism.

The word is normally a term of disparagement. Introduced into 16th-century religious discourse, it persisted in use into the 18th century and beyond. Originally employed mostly by Protestants, it was usually applied to persons of publicly conservative religious position and practice who were thought to be secretly  humanistic or reformed.

Friedrich Heer in his book The Medieval World (1961; English translation published in 1962) refers to the 12th-century circle at Chartres as past masters of nicodemism, which he describes as "dangerous thoughts, dangerous allusions to topical ecclesiastical and political affairs, and above all to ideas hard or impossible to reconcile with the dogma of the Church or the maxims of the prevailing theology".

In England during the 17th and 18th centuries the term was often applied to those suspected of secret Socinian, Arianist, or  proto-Deist beliefs.

Origin

The term was apparently introduced by John Calvin (1509–1564) in 1544 in his Excuse à messieurs les Nicodemites. Since the French monarchy had increased its prosecution of heresy with the Edict of Fontainebleau (1540), it had become increasingly dangerous to profess dissident belief publicly, and refuge was being sought in emulating Nicodemus.

In the Gospel of John (John 3, John 3:1-2) there appears the character Nicodemus, a Pharisee and member of the Sanhedrin. Although outwardly remaining a pious Jew, he comes to Jesus secretly by night to receive instruction. Although he was eventually made a saint, his dual allegiance was somewhat suspect.

Notable suspected Nicodemites
 Edward Courtenay, 1st Earl of Devon (c.1527–1556), courtier of Mary I of England
 Thomas Cranmer (1489–1556), first Anglican Archbishop of Canterbury under Henry VIII of England
 Michelangelo (1475–1564), who sculpted a portrait of himself as Nicodemus in his Florentine Pietà
 Isaac Newton (1643–1727), eminent scientist and theologian
 Reginald Cardinal Pole (1500–1558), last Roman Catholic Archbishop of Canterbury

See also
 An Historical Account of Two Notable Corruptions of Scripture
 Crypto-Christianity
 Crypto-Islam
 Crypto-Judaism
 Crypto-protestantism
 Crypto-papism
 Marrano
 Morisco
 Religious views of Isaac Newton
 Taqiya

References

Bibliography
 Ginzburg, Carlo "Il nicodemismo. Simulazione e dissimulazione religiosa nell'Europa del Cinquecento", Einaudi, Torino 1970
 Eire, Carlos M. N. "Prelude to Sedition: Calvin's Attack on Nicodemism and Religious Compromise".  Archiv für Reformationsgeschichte 76:120-45.
 Eire, Carlos M. N. "Calvin and Nicodemism: A Reappraisal".  Sixteenth Century Journal X:1, 1979.
 Livingstone, E. A. "Nicodemism". In The Concise Oxford Dictionary of the Christian Church. Oxford University Press, Oxford, 2000. Entry available here.
 Overell, M. Anne Italian Reform and English Reformations, c.1535–c.1585.  The Open University, UK. 2008. Excerpt available online.
 Overell, Anne.  "A Nicodemite in England and Italy: Edward Courtenay, 1548-46".  In John Foxe at Home and Abroad. D. M. Loades, ed.  Ashgate Publishing, Farnham, Surrey, UK, 2004.
 Pettegree, Andrew.  "Nicodemism and the English Reformation" in Marian Protestantism: Six Studies, St. Andrews Studies in Reformation History.  Aldershot, 1996, pp. 86–117.
 Shrimplin-Evangelidis, Valerie.  Michelangelo and Nicodemism: The Florentine Pietà.   College Art Association, 1989.
 Snobelen, Stephen D.  "Isaac Newton, heretic: the strategies of a Nicodemite."  The British Journal for the History of Science, 32:4:381-419. Cambridge University Press, 1999.
 Anderson Magalhães, All’ombra dell’eresia: Bernardo Tasso e le donne della Bibbia in Francia e in Italia, in Le donne della Bibbia, la Bibbia delle donne. Teatro, letteratura e vita, Atti del XV Convegno Internazionale di Studio organizzato dal Gruppo di Studio sul Cinquecento francese, Verona, 16-19 ottobre 2009, a cura di R. Gorris Camos, Fasano, Schena, 2012, pp. 159–218.

16th-century neologisms
Christian terminology
Protestant Reformation
Anti-Catholic slurs
Nicodemus